Simonsen Island is one of the Rønnbeck Islands in the Svalbard archipelago. It lies in Hinlopen Strait northeast of Cape Weyprecht on Spitsbergen. The wildlife consists largely of polar bears.

The island was discovered in 1867 by the Swedish-Norwegian polar explorer Nils Fredrik Rønnbeck. It is named after W. Simonsen (or Simonson), a Norwegian navigator that helped explore the Kara Sea in 1871 on board the Sleipner.

References

Islands of Svalbard
Seal hunting